St John Drelincourt Seymour  (15 April 1880 – 25 May 1950) was an Irish Anglican priest in the first half of the 20th century who served as Archdeacon of Cashel and Archdeacon of Emly.

Seymour was born in Limerick, Ireland. Educated at Trinity College, Dublin, he was ordained in 1904.

After curacies in Durrow and Thurles he was the incumbent at Toem, Ireland, then  Borris, before his years as Archdeacon of Cashell and Emly and Donohill afterwards.

He died on 25 May 1950 in Dublin.

Select bibliography  
Source: Ricorso
 United Diocese of Cashel and Emly, 1908, Belfast Public Library
 The Puritans of Ireland 1647-1661, 1912 & Clarendon Press 1969
 Irish Witchcraft and Demonology, 1913 & 1970 (Chap.3, Kyteler Case and its surroundings)
 True Irish Ghost Stories, 1914, 1926
 St Patrick’s Purgatory: A Medieval Pilgrimage in Ireland, 1919, University of Ulster Library
 The Tales of King Solomon, Oxford University Press, London 1924.
 Anglo-Irish Literature 1200-1582, 1929 & Octagon 1970
 Irish Visions of the Otherworld: A Contribution to the Study of Medieval Visions, 1930
 Adventures and Experiences of a Seventeenth Century Clergyman, 1909, Belfast Public Library
 Liber Primus Kilkenniensis - translation of 15th-century edition
 The Ormond Fragments 1 & 2 - Royal Irish Academy, 1932-1934

References

External links

 John D. Seymour (1924). Tales of King Solomon 

1880 births
1950 deaths
20th-century Irish writers
20th-century male writers
Alumni of Trinity College Dublin
Archdeacons of Cashel and Emly
Irish Anglicans